Closer To You is the third album by the Irish indie act The Coronas, released in November 2011.
It went straight into the Irish Indie Chart at number one, making number three in the overall chart. The album was produced by Tony Hoffer. Its lead single "Addicted to Progress" received more radio play in Ireland than any of the band's previous singles, topping Today FM's playlist chart for three consecutive weeks in December 2011.

Track listing
"What You Think You Know"
"Mark My Words"
"Closer to You"
"Dreaming Again"
"Blind Will Lead The Blind"
"Addicted To Progress"
"My God"
"Dreaming Again Part 2 (Wait For You)"
"Write To Me"
"Different Ending"
"Make It Happen"

Chart positions

References

2011 albums
The Coronas albums